The Prophet is a book of 26 prose poetry fables written in English by the Lebanese-American poet and writer Kahlil Gibran. It was originally published in 1923 by Alfred A. Knopf. It is Gibran's best known work. The Prophet has been translated into over 100 different languages, making it one of the most translated books in history, as well as one of the best selling books of all time. It has never been out of print.

Synopsis
The prophet Al Mustafa has lived in the city of Orphalese for 12 years and is about to board a ship which will carry him home.  He is stopped by a group of people, with whom he discusses topics such as life and the human condition. The book is divided into chapters dealing with love, marriage, children, giving, eating and drinking, work, joy and sorrow, houses, clothes, buying and selling, crime and punishment, laws, freedom, reason and passion, pain, self-knowledge, teaching, friendship, talking, time, good and evil, prayer, pleasure, beauty, religion, and death.

Popularity
The Prophet has been translated into more than 100 languages, making it one of the most translated books in history. By 2012, it had sold more than nine million copies in its American edition alone since its original publication in 1923.

Of an ambitious first printing of 2,000 in 1923, Knopf sold 1,159 copies. The demand for The Prophet doubled the following year—and doubled again the year after that. It was translated into French by Madeline Mason-Manheim in 1926. By the time of Gibran's death in 1931, it had also been translated into German. Annual sales reached 12,000 in 1935, 111,000 in 1961 and 240,000 in 1965. The book sold its one millionth copy in 1957. At one point, The Prophet sold more than 5,000 copies a week worldwide.

Inspiration
Born a Maronite, Gibran was influenced not only by his own religion but also by the Bahá’í Faith, Islam, and the mysticism of the Sufis. His knowledge of Lebanon's bloody history, with its destructive factional struggles, strengthened his belief in the fundamental unity of religions, something which his parents exemplified by welcoming people of various religions in their home. Connections and parallels have also been made to William Blake's work, as well as the theological ideas of Walt Whitman and Ralph Waldo Emerson such as reincarnation and the Over-soul. Themes of influence in his work were Arabic art, European Classicism (particularly Leonardo da Vinci) and Romanticism (Blake and Auguste Rodin), the Pre-Raphaelite Brotherhood, and more modern symbolism and surrealism.

Gibran’s strong connections to the Baháʼí Faith started around 1912. One of Gibran's acquaintances, Juliet Thompson, reported several anecdotes relating to Gibran. She recalled Gibran had met 'Abdu'l-Bahá, the leader of the religion, at the time of `Abdu'l-Bahá's journeys to the West. Gibran was unable to sleep the night before meeting him in person to draw his portrait in April 1912 on the island of Manhattan. Gibran later told Thompson that in 'Abdu'l-Bahá he had "seen the Unseen, and been filled." Gibran began work on The Prophet in 1912, when "he got the first motif, for his Island God," whose "Promethean exile shall be an Island one" rather than a mountain one. In 1928, after the death of `Abdu'l-Bahá, at a viewing of a movie of `Abdu'l-Bahá, Gibran rose to talk and proclaimed in tears an exalted station of `Abdu'l-Bahá and left the event weeping still.

Royalties and copyright control
The book entered the public domain in the United States on January 1, 2019. It was already in the public domain in the European Union, Canada, Russia, South Africa, and Australia.

Gibran instructed that on his death the royalties and copyrights to his materials be owned by his hometown, Bsharri, Lebanon. The Gibran National Committee (GNC), in Bsharri, manages the Gibran Museum. Founded in 1935, the GNC is a non-profit corporation holding the exclusive rights to manage the Lebanese author Kahlil Gibran's copyright in and to his literary and artistic works.

The Garden of the Prophet
Gibran followed The Prophet with The Garden of the Prophet, which was published posthumously in 1933. The Garden of the Prophet narrates Al Mustafa's discussions with nine disciples following Al Mustafa's return after an intervening absence.

Adaptations
 1973 – The Profit; Albran's Serial, a parody published in 1973 by Price/Stern/Sloan, California, as written by the fictional Kehlog Albran (pseudonym for authors Martin A. Cohen and Sheldon Shacket). It reached fourth printing in 1981.
 1974 – The Prophet by Khalil Gibran: A Musical Interpretation featuring Richard Harris. Music composed by Arif Mardin, Atlantic Records
 2002 – Electronic and new-age music composer Gandalf and narrator Thomas Klock created an audiobook CD with German version – Der Prophet – layered with music.
 2009 – The Prophet: Music Inspired by the Poetry of Khalil Gibran; An album by Australian oud virtuoso Joseph Tawadros, Winner of Limelight Award for Best World Music Achievement 2010, Nominated for an Australian Recording Industry Award (ARIA) for Best World Music Album 2010.
 2010 –  The Propheteer; A book of political satire reimagining The Prophet as George W. Bush lecturing his cronies on the White House lawn while waiting for his chopper bound for Texas.  
 2014 –  Kahlil Gibran's The Prophet; Salma Hayek announced an animated feature film version of the book, with her serving as producer and as the voice of the character Karima. Each chapter was directed by an individual director, with The Lion King'''s Roger Allers overseeing the project.
 2021 – The film An American Prophecy, directed by Aaron Dworkin and produced by Robin Schwartz, includes recitations from the book by front-line healthcare workers, who introduce each section with reflections on their experience battling the Covid-19 pandemic.

References

Bibliography
1973. The Prophet'' by Kahlil Gibran;  Published by Alfred A Knopf, Inc.;  A Borzoi (hardcover) Book, ASIN: B004S0ZKJO

External links

The Project Gutenberg eBook of The Prophet, by Kahlil Gibran (different formats)
 
 
The Prophet audiobook at Archive.org
The Garden of the Prophet audiobook at Archive.org
The Prophet audiobook from Legamus
The Kahlil Gibran collective His Life, Work and Legacy at KahlilGibran.com
Project Gutenberg Australia (e-text)

The Prophet on WikiSummaries
The Prophet Translated  article - linked to Academic Paper below. 
Porias in Literary Translation: A Case Study of The Prophet and Its Translations paper

1923 poetry books
Alfred A. Knopf books
Books adapted into films
Books by Kahlil Gibran
Essay collections
Fables
Philosophical fiction